{{DISPLAYTITLE:Iofetamine (123I)}}

Iofetamine (iodine-123, 123I), brand names Perfusamine, SPECTamine), or N-isopropyl-(123I)-p-iodoamphetamine (IMP), is a lipid-soluble amine and radiopharmaceutical drug used in cerebral blood perfusion imaging with single-photon emission computed tomography (SPECT). Labeled with the radioactive isotope iodine-123, it is approved for use in the United States as a diagnostic aid in determining the localization of and in the evaluation of non-lacunar stroke and complex partial seizures, as well as in the early diagnosis of Alzheimer's disease.

An analogue of amphetamine, iofetamine has shown to inhibit the reuptake of serotonin and norepinephrine as well as induce the release of these neurotransmitters and of dopamine with similar potencies to other amphetamines like d-amphetamine and p-chloroamphetamine. In addition, on account of its high lipophilicity, iofetamine rapidly penetrates the blood-brain-barrier. Accordingly, though not known to have been reported in the medical literature, iofetamine likely possesses psychostimulant and possibly entactogenic effects. However, based on structure-activity relationships, it may also be highly neurotoxic to serotonergic and dopaminergic neurons similarly to most other para-halogenated amphetamines.

See also 
 p-Iodoamphetamine
 N-Isopropylamphetamine

References 

Substituted amphetamines
Serotonin-norepinephrine-dopamine releasing agents
Iodoarenes
Isotopes of iodine
Radiopharmaceuticals
Stimulants
Isopropylamino compounds